The Genesis GV60 is a battery electric compact luxury crossover SUV produced by Genesis, a luxury vehicle marque of Hyundai. Slotted below the GV70, it is the first Genesis product to be developed on the Hyundai Electric Global Modular Platform (E-GMP).

Overview 

Genesis unveiled the GV60 on 19 August 2021; it was released globally on 30 September 2021. Codenamed JW during development, the vehicle sits on a dedicated EV platform shared by the Hyundai Ioniq 5 and the Kia EV6. Powertrain details include a single-motor application for lower trim levels as well as a dual-motor all-wheel-drive model.

The GV60 is the first to apply a new Genesis emblem imprinted with an elaborate Guilloche pattern and a clamshell hood that removes joints between the bodies. Also, the GV60 is equipped with Face Connect which recognizes the driver's face to control the door lock, seat, steering wheel, side mirrors, and infotainment. A smartphone-based digital key can be used to open the door of the vehicle and start the engine. This can be used through wireless software updates.

The exterior colors are a total of 11 colors, including Vique Black, Uyuni White, Matterhorn White, Seville Silver, etc. And the interior colors are a total of 5 colors, including Obsidian Black, Torrent Navy, Ash Gray/Glassier White, etc.

On September 8, 2022, GV60 received the highest rating of five stars at Euro NCAP. It achieved the highest rating in the comprehensive evaluation of four evaluation items: adult occupant protection, child occupant protection, pedestrian protection, and safety assistance system.

Powertrain 
The vehicle is available with a 77.4kWh battery that can be charged from 10 to 80% in 18 minutes with its 800V charging capabilities by using a 350kW charger.

Safety

Euro NCAP test results for a LHD, five door on a registration from 2022.

Awards 
 Red Dot Award: Product Design 2022 (the cars and motorcycles category)

Sales

References

External links 

 

GV60
Cars introduced in 2021
Mini sport utility vehicles
Luxury crossover sport utility vehicles
Production electric cars
Rear-wheel-drive vehicles
All-wheel-drive vehicles